Carl Hogg (born 5 July 1969) is a former Scotland international rugby union player. He is currently the Director of Academy and Development for Gloucester.

Rugby Union career

Amateur career

Hogg was educated at St. Mary's School, Melrose and Earlston High School.

He played the majority of his rugby career with Melrose RFC.

Provincial and professional career

He played for South of Scotland District. When the Scottish rugby union environment turned professional in 1996, he then played for the professional district Border Reivers.

That side folded in 1998 and Hogg went on to play for Edinburgh.

In 2001, he moved to Leeds Tykes and retired from playing two years later.

He has captained every club side he has played for.

International career

He played for Scotland U19.

He played for Scotland U21 and captained the side.

He was capped by Scotland 'B' on 2 March 1991 to play against France 'B'.

He had 17 appearances for Scotland 'A' between 1992 and 2000, captaining the side on 6 occasions.

Between 1992 and 1994 he made five appearances for Scotland.

Coaching career

Hogg started off at Leeds working with former England coach Stuart Lancaster before moving to London Welsh and then Edinburgh.  He joined Gloucester in 2006 as Academy coach before progressing to a senior role as Forwards coach.  He joined Dean Ryan as Head coach at Worcester Warriors in 2013, taking responsibility for first team games in all major competitions. On 30 June 2016 he was given control of first team duties after Ryan left the club. In February 2018 Worcester announced that Hogg would be leaving at the end of the season. 

On 25 October 2018, Hogg was appointed new interim Head coach of Scotland U20s before the 2019 Six Nations Under 20s Championship On 9 May 2019, Hogg returned to domestic rugby as he was named new Forwards coach for Welsh region Ospreys after the 2019 World Rugby Under 20 Championship ended. He departed from the Ospreys as of 22 October 2020. On 14 January 2021, Hogg became an Assistant coach for the Russia national team under Head coach Lyn Jones after leaving Ospreys. 

On 12 March 2021, Hogg returned to Gloucester to be appointed as their new Director of Academy and Development, working alongside Head of Academy Peter Walton.

References

External links

Carl Hogg at ESPNscrum

1969 births
Living people
People educated at St. Mary's School, Melrose
People educated at Earlston High School
Melrose RFC players
Leeds Tykes players
Scotland international rugby sevens players
Scottish rugby union coaches
Scottish rugby union players
Scotland international rugby union players
Male rugby sevens players
Leeds Tykes coaches
Rugby union flankers
Rugby union players from Galashiels
Scotland 'B' international rugby union players
Scotland 'A' international rugby union players
South of Scotland District (rugby union) players